Fasolada or fasoulada is a Greek, Mediterranean, and Cypriot soup of dry white beans, olive oil, and vegetables. It is sometimes called the "national food of the Greeks".

Fasolada is made by simmering beans with tomatoes and other vegetables such as carrots, onion, parsley, celery, and bay leaf. Lima beans are sometimes used instead of white beans. Recipes vary considerably, often including meat like bastırma and olive oil.

Similar dishes 
Its counterparts are Italian fagiolata, the Portuguese and Brazilian feijoada, Romanian fasole and Spanish fabada. A similar dish in Turkish cuisine is called kuru fasulye. The Arabic version is called fasoulia and is found in Egypt, Ethiopia, Iraq, Israel, Jordan, Lebanon, Libya, Palestine, Saudi Arabia, Sudan, Syria, and Yemen.

See also
 Gigandes plaki
 Arab cuisine
 Greek cuisine
 List of bean soups
 List of legume dishes
 List of soups

References

Bean soups
Greek soups
National dishes
Cypriot cuisine